

A
 Al Bernameg
 Al-Gama'a (TV series)
 Al Ostoura
 Abaza (TV series)
 Al-Tabari (TV series)

B
 Bakkar
 Black and White
 Bimbo

C 

 Cat's Head

D 

 Dawa'er Hob

E
 El Kabeer Awy

F 
 The Family of Mr Shalash

G 
 Ghosts of Sayala

H 

 Howa wa heya

I 

 Illusion and Truth

K 

 Kalabsh (Egyptian TV series)
 Kalabsh (season 2)
 Khan El-Khalili
 Kingdom of Gypsies

N 

 Naseeby We Esmetak

R 

 The Return of the Spirit
 Ruby (2012 TV series)

J
 Joe Show

S 
 Saturday Night Live bil Arabi
 Saraya Abdeen

T
 Tamer Wa Shaw'eyyah
 The Man with Five Faces
 The Truth..That Unknown
 Tahqeeq

Y 

 The Yacoubian Building (TV series)

External links
  Works produced in "Egypt" - elcinema

References 

Egyptian television series
Egypt